Psi hit and psi miss are terms used in discussion of parapsychological experimentation to describe the success or failure of the subject in achieving the desired result more often than could be expected through chance alone. Used only when the results are notably better than chance.

A psi miss is specifically used to refer to instances where the subject has failed to achieve the result through psi, rather than where they have a non-significant negative score gained through random guessing.

History
In 1942, Gertrude Schmeidler, a professor of psychology at City University of New York, used a questionnaire to discover the beliefs of test subjects concerning psi.  She called those who thought psi existed "sheep", and those who did not think psi existed (or did not believe it could influence the tests) she called "goats".  When she compared the results of the questionnaire to the results of the psi test, she found that the "sheep" scored significantly above chance, and the "goats" scored significantly below chance.  Schmeidler's results have since been confirmed by many other researchers.  In 1992, a meta-analysis of 73 experiments by 37 different researchers confirmed that subjects who believe psi is real average higher results than those who do not believe in it. A large-scale pre-registered replication in 2023 of "feeling the future" did not find any evidence for sheep-goats. According to Mario Varvoglis, PhD, President of the Parapsychological Association from 2001 to 2002:

See also
Parapsychology
Extra Sensory Perception
True-believer syndrome

References

Paranormal terminology